Since the formation of the Australian Army on 1 March 1901, it has used a variety of weaponry and equipment, sourced mainly from British, American and less frequently, other European manufacturers, but also weapons and equipment produced by local Australian manufacturers.

The Australian Army came into being when the six British colonies of Australia all held referendums to join, and voted in favour of forming a federation, creating the modern nation of the Commonwealth of Australia on 1 January 1901. Prior to doing so, each of the Australian colonies were responsible for their own defence, and all had separate colonial armies. As each colonial army was responsible for the defence of their own colony, each colony separately contracted the purchase of their own equipment, so at the time that each colonial army merged into the newly formed Australian Army, there was a variety of incompatible equipment used by the various interstate units.

One of the first tasks of the newly formed Army following restructure and the creation of unified hierarchy and command chains, was to uniformly equip the new national army. This was no easy task, as at the time of the foundation of the Australian Army, all six colonial armies were in the field involved in  the Second Boer War. Whilst badge-changing ceremonies were performed and hats and uniforms supplied, it proved impractical to fully re-equip in the field. Consequently, the Martini–Henry rifle, which was favoured by the majority of colonial units, continued in use until about 1910.

Second Boer War
The Australian Army was founded by a merger of the six separate armies of the six independent Australian British colonies. When those forces merged officially on 1 March 1901, during the Second Boer War in South Africa, all six colonies had troops already engaged in combat in the field. It was obviously impossible and unnecessary  to completely re-equip and re-uniform the forces while they were deployed, and most of the colonial armies wore similar khaki uniforms anyway. A symbolic ceremony to replace colonial badges was held in the field during which Australian soldiers were given the Rising Sun Badge, the new symbol of the Australian Army, for the first time.

Infantry weapons
Side-arms
 Beaumont–Adams revolver (.450 calibre)
 Enfield revolver (.476 calibre)
 Webley revolver (.455 calibre)
Long-arms
 Martini–Henry rifle (.577/.450 calibre)
 Snider–Enfield rifle (.577 calibre)
 Lee–Enfield rifle (.303 calibre)
 Lee–Metford rifle (.303 calibre)

Horses
 Waler horse

First World War

By the outbreak of World War I, the equipment of the Australian Army had become standardised, and was essentially the same as most of the armies of the British Empire. The one major difference was the preference of kangaroo leather over canvas for webbing and other equipment, straps and belts.

Aircraft
(The Australian Flying Corps which served in WWI was an Army unit, not a separate airforce.)

Second World War

At the beginning of World War II, the Australian Army was continuing with the practice of sourcing military equipment from the United Kingdom as it had done in the colonial era and the first three decades of the twentieth century. However, as the war progressed, Britain's difficulties in keeping up production demand, Australia's geographic isolation, and a differing focus on war policies and theatres, caused Australia increasingly to obtain arms, equipment, and military assistance from the United States.

Korean War
When the Korean War began many Australian units were still equipped with weapons that they had used during World War II. Whilst there were minor changes such as the replacement of the British QF 4.5 inch Howitzer by the American-built 105 mm Howitzer M3 as the primary artillery piece, the most dramatic changes to Australian equipment during the Korean War period were to the aircraft used by the Royal Australian Air Force. Important lessons learned during the Korean War later influenced the way the Australian Army re-equipped to adapt to the needs of modern warfare in time for the Australian Army's entry into the Vietnam War.

Vietnam War
The Vietnam War proved to be a highly mobile operation for Australian forces, who often engaged their enemies during arduous jungle patrols through thick and difficult terrain. Much of the equipment used on the battlefields of the Korean War proved to be too cumbersome for this type of warfare, including long-arms such as the Lee–Enfield SMLEs. However, the Australian Army had become an expert at jungle warfare during their campaigns in South-East Asia against the Imperial Japanese Army in World War II, and the lessons in jungle warfare they had learned proved invaluable in the choosing of equipment for the Vietnam War. Long rifles continued to be used by snipers, but infantry patrols favoured the use of assault rifles such as the L1A1 and M16. The heavy machine-guns which were useful for the static defences of the Korean War were replaced by the lighter general-purpose M60 machine gun, which was man-portable by a patrol machine-gunner.

Late 20th Century
After the Vietnam war the Australian Army suffered severe budget cut-backs, and expenditure on equipment decreased as a result. The army was scaled back in size, and experienced a period of very little overseas deployment for the first time in the post–World War II period. Despite this the Army did manage to continue to modernise its weaponry and equipment. During the 1980s traditional long-arms such as the L1A1 Self-Loading Rifle (SLR) were phased out and finally  withdrawn from front line service by 1990, and replaced by the locally produced F88 Austeyr, a derivative of the Austrian Steyr AUG which is still in service . During the 1980s the khaki field uniforms that had been used by the Australian Army since its foundation in 1901 were replaced by Disruptive Pattern Combat Uniform.

References

Bibliography
 

 
 

Historical